The Roman Catholic Diocese of Bongaigaon is a diocese located in the city of Bongaigaon in the Ecclesiastical province of Guwahati in India.

History 
 10 May 2000: Established as Diocese of Bongaigaon from the Metropolitan Archdiocese of Guwahati

Leadership 
 Bishops of Bongaigaon (Latin Rite)
 Bishop Thomas Pulloppillil (10 May 2000 – present)

References 
 GCatholic.org
 Catholic Hierarchy

Roman Catholic dioceses in India
Christianity in Assam
Christian organizations established in 2000
Roman Catholic dioceses and prelatures established in the 20th century
2000 establishments in Assam